HD 104067 b is an extrasolar planet which orbits the K-type main sequence star HD 104067, located approximately 68 light years away in the constellation Corvus. This planet has at least one-sixth the mass of Jupiter and takes over one-sevenths of a year to orbit the star at a semimajor axis of 0.26 AU. This planet was detected by HARPS on October 19, 2009, together with 29 other planets. It is also the first planet to be discovered in this constellation.

References 

Exoplanets discovered in 2009
Exoplanets detected by radial velocity
Giant planets
Corvus (constellation)